Enfield Shaker Historic District may refer to:

 The Enfield Shaker Museum in Enfield, New Hampshire, and its historic district
 The Enfield Shakers Historic District (Connecticut) in Enfield, Connecticut